The Rosemary Cemetery is a historic cemetery in Sarasota, Florida. The cemetery is located at the northwest corner of the original plat of the town of Sarasota.

History
The cemetery was acquired by the town of Sarasota in 1903. The cemetery is a significant indicator of the early settlement as it is the first public cemetery in Sarasota and the oldest extant man-made landscape feature in the city.

On November 16, 2003, it was added to the U.S. National Register of Historic Places.

Notable burials 

 Owen Burns
John Hamilton Gillespie

References

External links
 
 Sarasota County listings at National Register of Historic Places
 Rosemary Cemetery Project at New College of Florida - Faculty and Staff Websites

National Register of Historic Places in Sarasota County, Florida
Buildings and structures in Sarasota, Florida
Protected areas of Sarasota County, Florida
Cemeteries on the National Register of Historic Places in Florida
1886 establishments in Florida